Gallicolumba is a mid-sized genus of ground-dwelling doves (family Columbidae) which occur in rainforests on the Philippines. Local name 'punay' which is a general term for pigeons and doves. They are not closely related to the American ground doves (genus Columbina and related genera). Rather, the present genus is closest to the thick-billed ground pigeon.

This genus includes the bleeding-hearts known from the Philippines. Most are named for their vivid-red patch on the breast, which looks startlingly like a bleeding wound in some species and has reminded naturalists of a dagger stab. The diet of doves of this genus consists of fruits and seed.

Systematics and extinctions
Gallicolumba might be ranked as a (very small) subfamily, but the available data suggests that they are better considered part of a quite basal radiation of Columbidae which consists of many small and often bizarre lineages (e.g. Goura and Otidiphaps which are ecologically convergent to Galliformes, and maybe even the famous didines (Raphinae).

The genus contains seven species:
Sulawesi ground dove, Gallicolumba tristigmata
Cinnamon ground dove, Gallicolumba rufigula
Luzon bleeding-heart, Gallicolumba luzonica
Mindanao bleeding-heart, Gallicolumba crinigera
Mindoro bleeding-heart, Gallicolumba platenae
Negros bleeding-heart, Gallicolumba keayi
Sulu bleeding-heart, Gallicolumba menagei - possibly extinct (late 1990s?)

Many of the Pacific ground doves were removed from Gallicolumba (which was non-monophyletic) and reassigned to the genus Alopecoenas, which was later renamed Pampusana.

References

External links

 
Bird genera
Taxa named by Johann Georg Heck
Taxa described in 1849